Riwasa is a village (Dhani) in Tosham tehsil of the Bhiwani District in Haryana, North India. It is also known as Riwasa ki Dhani. , the village had 1,168 households with a total population of 6,328 of which 3,333 were male and 2,995 female.

Adjacent villages
Biran
Dinod
Kairu
Bapora
Tosham
Dharan
Nigana Khurd
Nigana Kalan
Mahu ki Dhani
(Dhani Riwasa

References

Villages in Bhiwani district